Fort Zeelandia may refer to the following Dutch forts :

 Fort Zeelandia (Taiwan), a fort in Tainan, Taiwan
 Siege of Fort Zeelandia, 1661–1662
 Fort Zeelandia (Paramaribo), in Suriname, originally built by the English and called Fort Willoughby
 Fort Zeelandia (Guyana) 
 Fort Zeelandia (Benin), on the Dutch Slave Coast